The Main Street Bridge is a historic structure located in Charles City, Iowa, United States. Before a bridge was built at this location local citizens would cross the river by way of a ferry, at a ford in summer, and across the ice in winter. The first bridge at this location was washed away in a flood while it was under construction in 1858. The second bridge was completed in 1864, and it was destroyed in a flood two years later. A temporary bridge was completed in 1867, and it was replaced by a truss bridge in 1870. It was used for 40 years despite an engineer's study in 1892 that suggested it be condemned. The Floyd County Board of Supervisors approved a replacement bridge in 1908. The old bridge was moved to a new spot five blocks downstream, but contract problems delayed construction of the new bridge. Advance Construction Company of Waukesha, Wisconsin was finally awarded a contract in March 1909. The three span concrete filled spandrel arch bridge was designed by their designing engineer G.W. Miller. It was completed in 1910 for about $40,000, which was paid for by the county and the city. The bridge was listed on the National Register of Historic Places in 1999.

References

Bridges completed in 1910
Bridges in Floyd County, Iowa
National Register of Historic Places in Floyd County, Iowa
Road bridges on the National Register of Historic Places in Iowa
Arch bridges in Iowa
Charles City, Iowa
Concrete bridges in the United States